The Al Deira Hotel is a beach hotel located in Gaza. It was built in 2000 and has 22 rooms which feature high, domed ceilings and views of the Mediterranean. The hotel is regularly used by foreign journalists covering Gaza.

The architecture of this boutique hotel, built around an inner courtyard, has an "Ottoman elegance". The style blends traditional Moroccan and Arab architecture with modern design influences. It is built with dark brown sun dried mud bricks, with white arches, vaulted and domed ceilings, and handmade furniture. The architect was Rashid Abdel Hamid. It was previously owned by UNDP employee Khaled Abdel Shafi and architect Rashid Abdel Hamid. In 2015, new management took over. 

The hotel has received a number of very positive reviews in Time magazine, by British journalist Alan Johnston and by Lonely Planet which describes the Al Deira as "swish, stylish and tightly run," and "without question the best hotel in town."

In 2010, UN Goodwill Ambassadors Mia Farrow and Egyptian actor Mahmoud Kabil visited the hotel.

On July 16, 2014 four children were killed by Israeli rockets whilst playing football on the beach just outside Al Deira Hotel.  Staff from the hotel brought wounded to the restaurant. Several foreign journalists were staying at the hotel and became witnesses to the killing.

References

External links
 Al Deira website

Hotels in Gaza City
Hotel buildings completed in 2000
Hotels established in 2000